Selo sanatoriya Yumatovo imeni 15-letiya BASSR (BASSR-źıñ 15 yıllığı isemendäge Yomataw şifaxanahı) is a rural locality (a selo) and the administrative centre of Yumatovsky Selsoviet, Ufimsky District, Bashkortostan, Russia. The population was 532 as of 2010. There is 1 street.

Geography 
Selo is located 38 km southwest of Ufa (the district's administrative centre) by road. Yumatovo is the nearest rural locality.

References 

Rural localities in Ufimsky District